The canton of Saint-Affrique is an administrative division of the Aveyron department, southern France. Its borders were not modified at the French canton reorganisation which came into effect in March 2015. Its seat is in Saint-Affrique.

It consists of the following communes:
 
La Bastide-Pradines
Calmels-et-le-Viala
Roquefort-sur-Soulzon
Saint-Affrique
Saint-Félix-de-Sorgues
Saint-Izaire
Saint-Jean-d'Alcapiès
Saint-Rome-de-Cernon
Tournemire
Vabres-l'Abbaye
Versols-et-Lapeyre

References

Cantons of Aveyron